Christian Geller (born 10 March 1975) is a German record producer, composer, arranger, and music manager, also known under his alias Nick Raider. More than 80 songs that he co-wrote or produced, ranging from artists such a David Hasselhoff, Hape Kerkeling, Yvonne Catterfeld, Truck Stop, Claudia Jung to No Angels, Caught in the Act, Banaroo and beFour, have entered the German Singles Chart.

Career
A huge fan of German duo Modern Talking, Geller began working with Modern Talking member Thomas Anders in the mid-1990s. In 1999, Geller and Anders founded a GmbH with a recording studio in Koblenz where Geller started making music professionally. Through Anders he linked with other artists for which he wrote and produced. Following a stint in Berlin, he returned to the Rhineland where he set up The Hafen Studios in Andernach along with his partners Fabian Zimmermann und Christof Neugebauer.

Selected production discography

References

German record producers
German composers
Living people
1975 births